The Air Force Falcons football team represents the United States Air Force Academy in the Mountain Division of the Mountain West Conference (MW), competing as part of the National Collegiate Athletic Association (NCAA) Division I Football Bowl Subdivision (FBS). The program began in 1955 as an independent; Air Force joined the Western Athletic Conference in 1980 and later moved to the Mountain West. During this sixty-two year period, the Falcons have had seven head coaches. Troy Calhoun has been the head coach of the program since December 2006, following Fisher DeBerry's retirement.

The falcon was adopted as the team's nickname by the academy's inaugural 1955 freshman team, who felt the bird characterizes the role the school's airmen will play following graduation. A series of live falcons, nicknamed "Mach 1", have served as the team mascot since that 1955 season. The Falcons have played in 757 games over the programs 66-season history. During that time, four of the programs coaches have led teams to a combined twenty-six bowl games. Additionally, two, DeBerry and Calhoun, have led the program to a divisional title and DeBerry guided the school to three conference championships. Both DeBerry and Buck Shaw, the former of whom spent his entire head coaching career at Air Force, have been inducted into the College Football Hall of Fame.

DeBerry holds most of Air Force's coaching records, including years coached (23), games coached (279), total wins (169), total losses (109), overall win percentage (0.608), conference wins (100), conference losses (73), conference win percentage (0.578), and postseason appearances (12). Bill Parcells has the fewest wins (3) and lowest win percentage (0.273). Robert V. Whitlow, the program's first coach, has the fewest games coached (8) and fewest losses (4). Ken Hatfield has the lowest win percentage among coaches with more than one season (0.449).

Key

Coaches

Notes

References
General

 
 

Specific

Lists of college football head coaches

Colorado sports-related lists